Bori Bunder railway station was a railway station, situated at Bori Bunder, Bombay, Maharashtra, in India. It was from here that first passenger train of the subcontinent ran to Thane in 1853. This station was rebuilt as Victoria Terminus later in 1888.

Construction 
Built by the then Great Indian Peninsula Railway, this railway station takes its name from the nearby locality, Bori Bunder.

Reconstruction 
This station was rebuilt as Victoria Terminus later in 1888. The station was eventually renamed as the Chhatrapati Shivaji Maharaj Terminus (CSMT) after Maharashtra's famed 17th-century king, Chhatrapati Shivaji Maharaj.

See also 

 Bori Bunder
 Chhatrapati Shivaji Maharaj Terminus
 Thane railway station

References

External links 
 Central Railways - Official Website
  1855 Map Of Bombay showing Bori Bunder and other early stations
^  Page of the above file^

Defunct railway stations in Mumbai
Railway stations in India opened in 1853
Railway stations closed in 1878
Chhatrapati Shivaji Terminus